Breich railway station is a rural railway station serving the village of Breich in West Lothian, Scotland. It was the sixth-least-used station in the UK until 2018-19 and was the second-least-used in Scotland, after Barry Links as well as being the least used station in West Lothian.

History 
The station was opened by the Caledonian Railway on their Cleland and Midcalder Line on 9 July 1869. Breich is named after the nearby Breich Water. The station pre-dates the present-day (2015) village of Breich and OS maps show that it has never possessed freight facilities such as loading docks and sidings, etc.

The surrounding area, although now very rural, was once highly industrialised with several collieries, lime works, iron workings, etc. nearby, together with the Levenseat Branch of the North British Railway and the originally 4 ft 6in Scotch gauge Wilsontown, Morningside and Coltness line with its old terminus station of Longridge opened in 1845 and closed in 1848.

A ticket office and waiting room was still present in 1962 as shown by the photograph of that date, together with a linesman's brick hut building, both on the Glasgow bound platform. The final section of the platforms running towards Edinburgh was  slightly higher, had larger edging stones and were of a different construction suggesting that they were built at a different date than the rest of the platforms. The station gardens had an unusual diversity of planted shrubs and trees.

The station was rebuilt on the same site in 2018 and it has lost the old pedestrian overbridge and wooden shelter. It has new platforms, two modern style passenger shelters, additional outside seating and electronic travel information displays. Access from platform 1 to 2 is via the rebuilt road overbridge. The car parking area is unchanged and the access is ill-defined due to the presence of a crossroads and traffic lights.

Services

2011
Mondays to Saturdays saw one train to Edinburgh and two towards Glasgow Central with no Sunday service.

2018 
Monday to Saturdays the station was served by one eastbound towards Edinburgh and one westbound train towards Glasgow Central per day. There was no Sunday service.

2019 
From May 2019, an hourly service has been introduced Monday - Saturday and a 2 hourly service on Sundays.

Station usage 
In 2014–15, Breich was the tenth least-used station in Britain, with 92 passenger exits and entries.

West Lothian Council's Route Utilisation Strategy suggests that if there was an increase in service frequency on the Shotts Line more services could stop at Breich. This could help future developments in the Breich and Longridge areas.

Proposed closure 
On 21 June 2017, Network Rail announced that they had begun consultation on the proposed closure of the station due to low patronage and if retained will avoid heavy expenditure to update the station prior to electrification of the line. It would have been the first station in Scotland to close in over 30 years.

The overwhelming response to the consultation was in favour of keeping Breich station open. Many respondents wished to see more services calling at Breich Station to increase patronage. It has been confirmed that the station will remain open and plans are being developed to possibly improve services.

The station was closed temporarily from 23 June 2018 for 12 weeks during redevelopment as part of a £2.4 million project to make it suitable for new electric trains. The redevelopment included work to the platforms in order to make them compliant in both height and length for the new services as well as ensuring ramped access to both platforms and to station facilities such as waiting shelters, CCTV, etc... The footbridge was removed at this time with access gained from the upgraded road overbridge.

References

Notes

Sources

External links

Commentary and video on Breich and Longridge Railway Stations

Railway stations in West Lothian
Railway stations served by ScotRail
Low usage railway stations in the United Kingdom
Railway stations in Great Britain opened in 1869
Former Caledonian Railway stations
1869 establishments in Scotland